Vaughn Connaly (born August 25, 1902, date of death unknown) was a defensive back/halfback in the American Football League. He played for the 1926 Newark Bears. He played collegiately for the Georgia Tech football team.

Notes

1902 births
Year of death missing
Georgia Tech Yellow Jackets football players